The 2017 FIM Cross-Country Rallies World Championship season is the 15th season of the FIM Cross-Country Rallies World Championship. Pablo Quintanilla won his second world title.

Calendar
The calendar for the 2017 season featured five rallies.

Results

Championship standings

 Points for final positions were awarded as follows:

 All riders were awarded 3 bonus points for taking part in the first stage (or the prologue) of an event. No rider was required to be classified in order to score these bonus points. 

 Also, 1 bonus point was awarded for each stage win (except prologue).

Motorbike riders' world championship

 A total of 67 riders scored championship points.

Motorbike manufacturers' world championship

References 

2017 in motorcycle sport
FIM Cross-Country Rallies World Championship